= Vibe Lebanon =

Middle East's first Internet radio station

Vibe Lebanon launched in November 1998 is the Middle East's first Internet radio station. It is based at Beirut.
